Sincerely, Brenda Lee is the sixth studio album by American singer Brenda Lee. The album was released February 12, 1962 on Decca Records and was produced by Owen Bradley. It was the first of two studio albums released by Brenda Lee in 1962 and did not contain any singles.

Background and content 
Sincerely, Brenda Lee was recorded in five separate sessions at the Bradley Film and Recording Studio in Nashville, Tennessee, United States under the direction of Owen Bradley. The first session began on January 8, 1961 and the last session took place on October 28, 1961. The album consisted of twelve tracks of material of previously recorded Pop music standards. It includes covers of "Lazy River" and "Fools Rush In". It also includes a cover of "Hold Me", which would later become a major Pop hit in 1964 for P.J. Proby. Unlike any of Lee's previous releases for the Decca label, the album did not contain any uptempo numbers that resembled that of Rock and Roll of Rockabilly music. Richie Unterberger of Allmusic found that the album did not "add much versatility" because of this missing element. Unterberger reviewed the album and gave it three out of five stars, calling it, "one of the more forgettable albums from her prime, of value only to big fans and completists. ... The problem was that the record featured almost nothing but these kind of songs, most of them taken at a slow tempo, and none of them rock & rollers (or hit singles, for that matter)."

Release 
Sincerely, Brenda Lee was originally released as an LP record, containing six songs on the record's "A-side" and six songs on the record's "B-side" as well. The album has since be reissued in the United Kingdom on a compact disc. Sincerely, Brenda Lee was officially released on February 12, 1962 on Decca Records and it peaked at #29 on the Billboard 200 albums chart.

Track listing 
Side one
"You Always Hurt the One You Love" – (Doris Fisher, Allan Roberts) 2:41
"Lazy River" – (Sidney Arodin, Hoagy Carmichael) 2:15
"You've Got Me Crying Again" – (Isham Jones, Charles Newman) 2:36
"It's the Talk of the Town" – (Jerry Livingston, Al J. Neiburg, Marty Symes) 3:10
"Send Me Some Lovin'" – (John Marascalco, Leo Price) 2:50
"How Deep Is the Ocean (How High Is the Sky)" – (Irving Berlin) 3:04

Side two
"I'll Always Be In Love With You" – (Bud Green, Herman Ruby, Sam H. Stept) 2:30
"I Miss You So" – (Jimmy Henderson, Sid Robin, Bertha Scott) 2:51
"Fools Rush In (Where Angels Fear to Tread)" – (Rube Bloom, Johnny Mercer) 2:35
"Only You (And You Alone)" – (Buck Ram, Andie Rand) 2:53
"Hold Me" – (Jack Little, David Oppenheim, Ira Schuster) 2:34
"I'll Be Seeing You" – (Sammy Fain, Irving Kahal) 2:35

Personnel 
 Byron Bach – strings
 Brenton Banks – strings
 George Binkley – strings
 Harold Bradley – guitar
 Cecil Brower – strings
 Howard Carpenter – strings
 Floyd Cramer – piano
 Dottie Dillard – background vocals
 Ray Edenton – guitar
 Buddy Emmons – steel guitar
 Solie Fott – strings
 Buddy Harman – drums
 Lillian Hunt – strings
 Anita Kerr – background vocals
 Douglas Kirkham – drums
 Jack Kline – strings
 Brenda Lee – lead vocals
 Grady Martin – guitar
 Mildred Oonk – strings
 Louis Nunley – background vocals
 Suzanne Parker – strings
 Boots Randolph – saxophone
 Vernel Richardson – strings
 Bill Wright – background vocals
 Joe Zinkan – bass

Sales chart positions 
Album

References 

1962 albums
Brenda Lee albums
Albums produced by Owen Bradley
Decca Records albums